The RuPaul Show is an American talk/variety show that premiered on VH1 in 1996. Hosted by the drag performer RuPaul, the show had many famous musical guests and was notable as being one of the first national television programs in the United States hosted by an openly gay host. Michelle Visage, a radio personality and former singer, was the show's co-host.

Overview
The show features RuPaul interviewing various celebrity guest ranging from musicians, actors, and pop culture figures. In addition to interviews, the series also featured comedy skits, and comedic field reports. RuPaul would also perform his favorite songs along with two male dancers. Diana Ross, a frequent inspiration for RuPaul, made a rare appearance on the show.

References

External links
 

1990s American variety television series
1996 American television series debuts
1998 American television series endings
1990s American television talk shows
English-language television shows
Works by RuPaul
Television series by World of Wonder (company)
VH1 original programming